Ronald Balfour Corbett  (4 December 1930 – 31 March 2016) was a Scottish actor, broadcaster, comedian and writer. He had a long association with Ronnie Barker in the BBC television comedy sketch show The Two Ronnies. He achieved prominence in David Frost's 1960s satirical comedy programme The Frost Report (with Barker) and subsequently starred in sitcoms such as No – That's Me Over Here!, Now Look Here, and Sorry!.

Corbett began his acting career after moving from Edinburgh to London; he had early roles in the TV series Crackerjack and The Saint, and appeared in the films You're Only Young Twice, Rockets Galore!, Casino Royale, Some Will, Some Won't, and No Sex Please, We're British. He first worked with Ronnie Barker in the BBC TV series The Frost Report in 1966, and the two of them were given their own show by the BBC five years later. The Two Ronnies ran as a comedy sketch show from 1971 to 1987, and became Corbett and Barker's most famous work; Corbett became known for his meandering chair monologues.

Early life
Corbett was born on 4 December 1930 at The Royal Maternity Hospital in Edinburgh, Scotland, the son of William Balfour Corbett (1898–1974), a master baker, and his London-born wife Annie Elizabeth Corbett (née Main; 1900–1991). He had a brother about six years younger, Allan, and a sister about ten years younger, Margaret. Corbett's grandfather was principal organist at St Andrews church of Scotland in the early 20th century and features in church histories of the time.

Corbett was educated at James Gillespie's Boys School and the Royal High School in the city. After leaving school, he decided he wanted to be an actor while performing in amateur theatricals at a church youth club. His first job, however, was with the Ministry of Agriculture.

Corbett carried out national service with the Royal Air Force, during which he was the shortest commissioned officer in the British Forces. Having enlisted as aircraftman 2nd class Service No.2446942, he received a commission into the secretarial branch of the RAF as a pilot officer (national service) on 25 May 1950. He transferred to the R.A.F. Reserve (National Service List) on 28 October 1951, thereby ending his period of active service. He was promoted to flying officer on 6 September 1952.

Career
Following national service, Corbett moved to London to start his acting career. References to his height frequently cropped up in his self-deprecating humour. In one of his earliest stage appearances, he was billed as "Ronald Corbett" at Cromer in Take it Easy in 1956, with Graham Stark. He appeared in Crackerjack as a regular in its early days, one episode with Winifred Atwell. He had a walk-on in an early episode of the 1960s series The Saint (as "Ronald Corbett") and appeared in films including You're Only Young Twice (1952), Rockets Galore! (1957), Casino Royale (1967), Some Will, Some Won't (1970) and the film version of the farce No Sex Please, We're British (1973).

Corbett starred in the first London production of the musical The Boys from Syracuse (as Dromio of Syracuse) in 1963 at the Theatre Royal, Drury Lane, alongside Bob Monkhouse. In 1965 he was in cabaret at Winston's, Danny La Rue's Mayfair nightclub. David Frost saw him and asked him to appear in The Frost Report. Corbett was in the West End, playing Will Scarlett in Lionel Bart's Robin Hood musical Twang!!. It failed, leaving Corbett free to accept. It was while working at Danny La Rue's nightclub that Corbett met Anne Hart, whom he was to marry that year. The marriage lasted 49 years, until his death.

With David Frost 
Corbett first worked with Ronnie Barker in The Frost Report (1966–67). The writers and cast were mostly Oxbridge graduates from the Footlights tradition. Corbett said he and Barker were drawn together as two grammar school or state secondary school boys, who had not gone to university. The show was a mixture of satirical monologues, sketches and music. Corbett and Barker were beginning to be thought of as a pair.

They appeared with John Cleese in one of the most repeated comedy sketches in British television: the Class sketch. Corbett's height provided a key cue for both the visual humour and satirical value of the sketch, as he "looked up" to both Cleese and Barker's characters, and he got the pay-off line: "I get a pain in the back of my neck."

Continuing under Frost, Corbett starred in No – That's Me Over Here!, a sitcom written by Frost Report writers Barry Cryer, Graham Chapman and Eric Idle (ITV 1967–70). Cryer and Chapman wrote two follow-ups: Now Look Here (BBC 1971–73) and The Prince of Denmark (BBC 1974). Corbett also appeared in Frost on Sunday (ITV 1968) and hosted The Corbett Follies (ITV 1969). Frost was also the promoter of Corbett's 1970 novelty single "It's All Going Up Up Up", a satire on inflation.

He was a subject of the television programme This Is Your Life in April 1970 when he was surprised by Eamonn Andrews while appearing on the Frost on Sunday programme.

The Two Ronnies 
Corbett's BBC television comedy show with Ronnie Barker, The Two Ronnies, ran from 1971 to 1987. Barker and Corbett performed sketches and musical numbers. Corbett presented a monologue. Sitting in a large easy chair (emphasising his small size), and usually wearing a Lyle & Scott golfing V-neck sweater, he would stretch telling a simple joke over several minutes, often allowing himself to appear to lose his train of thought.

Later work
Corbett's best-known role away from The Two Ronnies was as the 40-something Timothy Lumsden, dominated by his mother, in the sitcom Sorry! (1981–88). In 1996, he appeared on the première of the short-lived BBC game show Full Swing, hosted by Jimmy Tarbuck. Corbett played Reggie Sea Lions in the film Fierce Creatures (1997), written by his former Frost Report colleague John Cleese.

Corbett hosted the game show Small Talk and played minor parts occasionally since its end – such as Griselda in a television production of Cinderella in 2000, and reviving his armchair monologue routines for a weekly appearance in a stand-up show hosted by Ben Elton. In 2003, he appeared in advertisements for the Sky+ digital television service alongside Alice Cooper. The premise was a running gag about their being happy housemates. In December 2004, Corbett appeared on the BBC news quiz Have I Got News for You.

In 2005, Corbett teamed up again with Ronnie Barker for The Two Ronnies Sketchbook, comedy sketches from their original series with newly recorded linking material. Also in March 2005, Corbett appeared with comedian Peter Kay in the music video for the number one single "Is This the Way to Amarillo?" to raise money for Comic Relief. Corbett is remembered for accidentally falling on the treadmill that was out of shot in the green screen video; however, he found the fall funny when played back, and it was kept in the final version. He performed in Children's Party at the Palace as Mr Tibbs, the Queen's butler.

In 2006, Corbett played a hyper-realised version of himself in Extras, caught taking drugs at the BAFTA Awards. He also starred as himself in Little Britain Abroad, in which Bubbles DeVere tried successfully to seduce him. He opened the centre in Cromer, Norfolk, named after Henry Blogg. Corbett was the castaway in the BBC Radio 4 show Desert Island Discs on 21 October 2007. In 2007, he appeared in an episode of Gordon Ramsay's The F Word. He featured as a Slitheen in a Sarah Jane Adventures episode for Red Nose Day 2009. He had a television interview about his life on 7 November 2009 for Piers Morgan's Life Stories.

In February 2010, Corbett was in the John Landis thriller comedy Burke & Hare. In August 2010 he was a panellist in the BBC 1 comedy show Would I Lie to You?. In the same month, he was the star of the Good Food HD programme Ronnie Corbett's Supper Club with Rob Brydon and Steve Speirs. The show's premise was that the main guest of the programme must choose a meal as if it were their last, and Corbett would cook it for him/her and his other guest, while they chatted about the guest's past and their current/future projects. In December of the same year he starred in a one-off special, The One Ronnie.

From 2010, Corbett starred in the BBC Radio 4 sitcom When The Dog Dies. The series reunited him with Ian Davidson and Peter Vincent, the writers of Sorry! The series returned to BBC Radio Four for another three series.

Award and honours
Already an Officer of the Order of the British Empire (OBE), Corbett was promoted to Commander of the Order of the British Empire (CBE) in the 2012 New Year Honours for services to entertainment and charity. In 2002, the Queen Margaret University College in Edinburgh awarded him an honorary degree.

Personal life
On 30 May 1966, Corbett married actress and dancer Anne Hart; they had two daughters, actresses Emma and Sophie Corbett. Their first child, Andrew, had a heart defect and died when he was 6 weeks old at St Thomas' Hospital, in London.

Corbett lived in Addington, London from 1970 to 2003. He also had a Scottish home in Gullane, East Lothian and often spoke of wanting to become a beekeeper, but never got around to doing it.

Corbett was a golfer and appeared in celebrity and pro–am events; in 2009, he made a documentary with Colin Montgomerie in which they played at Gleneagles. A keen cricket fan, Corbett was also a president of the cricketing charity the Lord's Taverners (1982 and 1987). He supported his local football club, Crystal Palace FC, as well as his hometown club, Heart of Midlothian FC.

In mid-2014, Corbett attended a party at 10 Downing Street hosted by Conservative Prime Minister David Cameron. In August 2014, Corbett was one of 200 public figures who were signatories to a letter to The Guardian expressing their hope that Scotland would vote to remain part of the United Kingdom in September's referendum on that issue.

Death
On 31 March 2016, Corbett died at the age of 85, at Shirley Oaks Hospital in Shirley, London, surrounded by his family. He had been diagnosed with motor neuron disease in March 2015.
 
John Cleese said that Corbett had "the best timing" he had ever watched. Sir Bruce Forsyth said Corbett's death marked "one of the saddest days of my life". David Walliams, a close friend of Corbett, said that he was his "comedy idol".

Corbett's funeral service, for family and friends, was held on 18 April 2016, at the St John the Evangelist Church near his home in Shirley. In tribute to one of his classic Two Ronnies comedy sketches, Four Candles were displayed at the back of the altar. His body was cremated following a private service at Croydon Crematorium. Mourners included Walliams, Sir Michael Parkinson, Rob Brydon and Jimmy Tarbuck. Barry Cryer, who worked with and first met Corbett 50 years before, said, "I can't think of him without smiling... I'm here and tipping my hat to him." A memorial service for Corbett was held in Westminster Abbey on 7 June 2017.

Filmography

Film

Television

Notes

References

External links

 
 Ronnie Corbett's Supper Club

1930 births
2016 deaths
20th-century Scottish male actors
21st-century Scottish male actors
Best Entertainment Performance BAFTA Award (television) winners
British male comedy actors
British sketch comedians
Commanders of the Order of the British Empire
Deaths from motor neuron disease
Neurological disease deaths in England
Male actors from Edinburgh
People educated at James Gillespie's High School
People educated at the Royal High School, Edinburgh
Royal Air Force officers
Scottish humorists
Scottish male comedians
Scottish male film actors
Scottish male television actors
Scottish people of English descent
Television personalities from Edinburgh
Royal Air Force airmen
20th-century Royal Air Force personnel
Military personnel from Edinburgh